Parapseudidae is a family of crustaceans belonging to the order Tanaidacea.

Subdivisions
According to the World Register of Marine Species, the following subfamilies and genera are accepted within Paratanaoidea:

 Pakistanapseudinae Gutu, 2008
 Actenos Bamber, 2013
 Biropalostoma Gutu & Angsupanich, 2004
 Leptolicoa Gutu, 2006
 Pakistanapseudes Bacescu, 1978
 Platylicoa Gutu, 2006
 Ramosiseta Gutu, 2008
 Swireapseudes Bamber, 1997
 Thaicungella Gutu & Angsupanich, 2004
 Unguispinosus Gutu, 2008
 Parapseudinae Gutu, 2008
 Akanthoparapseudes Heard & Morales-Núñez, 2011
 Aponychos Bamber, Chatterjee & Marshall, 2012
 Ascumnella Gutu & Heard, 2002
 Brachylicoa Gutu, 2006
 Ctenapseudes Bamber, Ariyananda & Silva, 1997
 Discapseudes Bacescu & Gutu, 1975
 Gutuapseudes Edgar, 1997
 Hainanius Bamber, 1999
 Halmyrapseudes Bacescu & Gutu, 1974
 Longiflagrum Gutu, 1995
 Longipedis Larsen & Shimomura, 2006
 Parapseudes Sars, 1882
 Podictenius Gutu, 2006
 Pseudoapseudes Gutu, 1981
 Pseudohalmyrapseudes Larsen & Hansknecht, 2004
 Remexudes Błażewicz-Paszkowycz & Bamber, 2007
 Saltipedis Gutu, 1995

References

Tanaidacea